Grassy Butte is an unincorporated community in southeastern McKenzie County, North Dakota, United States. It lies along U.S. Route 85, south of the city of Watford City, the county seat of McKenzie County.  Its elevation is 2,661 feet (811 m).  It has a post office with the ZIP code 58634.

Grassy Butte currently has a gas station/convenience store and a bar. The elementary school has closed and the property was sold. The residents now send their children to either Killdeer, Watford City or Belfield schools.

The town also houses many different businesses, including a welding production shop, various construction companies, and a tractor repair shop.
It is where Roxanna's house is located in Peace Like a River by Leif Enger.

The Grassy Butte Post Office, owned by the McKenzie County Historical Society, is listed on the National Register of Historic Places.

References

Unincorporated communities in McKenzie County, North Dakota
Unincorporated communities in North Dakota